A Kind of Alchemy is the second studio album from the alternative/progressive rock band byron. Released on 23 October 2009 at The Silver Church Club in Bucharest. It contains two singles, "Diggin' a Hole" and "King Of Clowns".

Music

A Kind Of Alchemy contains blues, progressive and funk influences. Dan Byron said that "the mood is nocturnal, rather intimate, sometimes playful or even exuberant", and the album as a whole deals with the "process of creation, ranging from madness to zen". One part of the album has an extra sensitivity, another part is more aggressive, with a clear rhythm section.

Track listing

Personnel

byron
Dan Byron – vocals, acoustic guitar, flute, melodica
Costin Oprea – electric guitar
Cristi Mateşan – drums
6fingers – keyboards, backing vocals, rhodes, accordion
Vladimir Săteanu - bass

Additional musicians
René Popescu - violin
Ana Ghiţă - violin
Alexandra Toader - viola
Alexandru Gorneanu - cello
Petre Ionuţescu - trumpet
Jane D. - backing vocals on "A Little Bit Deranged"
Lu Cozma - backing vocals on "War"

Production
Produced by byron and A&A Records
Mixed and mastered by Victor Panfilov at Real Sound & Vision

References

Byron (band) albums
2009 albums